The 1991–92 Cypriot First Division was the 53rd season of the Cypriot top-level football league. APOEL won their 15th title.

Format
Fourteen teams participated in the 1991–92 Cypriot First Division. All teams played against each other twice, once at their home and once away. The team with the most points at the end of the season crowned champions. The last two teams were relegated to the 1992–93 Cypriot Second Division. The 12th-placed team faced the 3rd-placed team of the 1991–92 Cypriot Second Division, in a two-legged relegation play-off for one spot in the 1992–93 Cypriot First Division.

The champions ensured their participation in the 1992–93 UEFA Champions League and the runners-up in the 1992–93 UEFA Cup.

Point system
Teams received three points for a win, one point for a draw and zero points for a loss.

Changes from previous season
APOP Paphos and APEP were relegated from previous season and played in the 1991–92 Cypriot Second Division. They were replaced by the first two teams of the 1990–91 Cypriot Second Division, Evagoras Paphos and Omonia Aradippou.

Stadia and locations

League standings

Results

Relegation play-off
The 12th-placed team Olympiakos faced the 3rd-placed team of the 1991–92 Cypriot Second Division APEP, in a two-legged play-off for one spot in the 1992–93 Cypriot First Division. Olympiakos won both matches and secured their place in the 1992–93 Cypriot First Division.

Olympiakos 2–0 APEP
APEP 0–3 Olympiakos

See also
 Cypriot First Division
 1991–92 Cypriot Cup
 List of top goalscorers in Cypriot First Division by season
 Cypriot football clubs in European competitions

References

Sources

Cypriot First Division seasons
Cyprus
1991–92 in Cypriot football